August Wilhelm Eberhard Christoph Wibel (1775, Ernsbach near Öhringen – 1814, Wertheim am Main) was a German physician and botanist.

He was a student at the University of Jena, earning his medical doctorate in 1797. Later, he worked as a physician in the city of Wertheim am Main.

He described a number of plant species, and is the taxonomic authority of the genus Sciophila (family Liliaceae). The fern genus Wibelia (family Davalliaceae) was named in his honor by Johann Jakob Bernhardi.

Principal works 
 Primitiae florae Werthemensis, 1799.
 Beyträge zur Beförderung der Pflanzenkunde: Ersten Bandes erste Abtheilung, 1800 - Contributions to the advancement of botany.

References 

1775 births
1814 deaths
19th-century German botanists
University of Jena alumni